The World Economic Forum (WEF) is an international non-governmental and lobbying organisation based in Cologny, canton of Geneva, Switzerland. It was founded on 24 January 1971 by German engineer Klaus Schwab. The foundation, which is mostly funded by its 1,000 member companies – typically global enterprises with more than US$5 billion in turnover – as well as public subsidies, views its own mission as "improving the state of the world by engaging business, political, academic, and other leaders of society to shape global, regional, and industry agendas".

The WEF is mostly known for its annual meeting at the end of January in Davos, a mountain resort in the eastern Alps region of Switzerland. The meeting brings together some 3,000 paying members and selected participants – among whom are investors, business leaders, political leaders, economists, celebrities and journalists – for up to five days to discuss global issues across 500 sessions.

Aside from Davos, the organization convenes regional conferences in locations across Africa, East Asia, Latin America, and India and holds two additional annual meetings in China and the United Arab Emirates. It furthermore produces a series of reports, engages its members in sector-specific initiatives and provides a platform for leaders from selected stakeholder groups to collaborate on projects and initiatives.

The Forum suggests that a globalised world is best managed by a self-selected coalition of multinational corporations, governments and civil society organizations (CSOs), which it expresses through initiatives like the "Great Reset" and the "Global Redesign". 

The World Economic Forum and its annual meeting in Davos have received criticism over the years, including the organization's corporate capture of global and democratic institutions, its institutional whitewashing initiatives, the public cost of security, the organization's tax-exempt status, unclear decision processes and membership criteria, a lack of financial transparency, and the environmental footprint of its annual meetings. As a reaction to criticism within Swiss society, the Swiss federal government decided in February 2021 to reduce its annual contributions to the WEF. Furthermore, the WEF is criticized as "hypocritical" towards Palestinian human rights when it rejected a petition from its own constituents to condemn Israel’s aggression against Palestinians, claiming it is an "impartial" organization, and then a few months later voluntarily condemned Russia’s aggression against Ukraine. The WEF has also been the target of conspiracy theories.

The cost to be paid by companies for a delegate to the WEF were US$70,000 in the early 2000 years, and in 2022 were US$120,000.

History

The WEF was founded in 1971 by Klaus Schwab, a business professor at the University of Geneva. First named the European Management Forum, it changed its name to the World Economic Forum in 1987 and sought to broaden its vision to include providing a platform for resolving international conflicts.

In February 1971, Schwab invited 450 executives from Western European firms to the first European Management Symposium held in the Davos Congress Centre under the patronage of the European Commission and European industrial associations, where Schwab sought to introduce European firms to American management practices. He then founded the WEF as a nonprofit organization based in Geneva and drew European business leaders to Davos for the annual meetings each January.

The second European Management Forum, in 1972, was the first meeting at which one of the speakers at the forum was a head of government, President Pierre Werner of Luxembourg.

Events in 1973, including the collapse of the Bretton Woods fixed-exchange rate mechanism and the Yom Kippur War, saw the annual meeting expand its focus from management to economic and social issues, and, for the first time, political leaders were invited to the annual meeting in January 1974.

Through the forum's first decade, it maintained a playful atmosphere, with many members skiing and participating in evening events. Appraising the 1981 event, one attendee noted that "the forum offers a delightful vacation on the expense account."

Political leaders soon began to use the annual meeting as venue for promoting their interests. The Davos Declaration was signed in 1988 by Greece and Turkey, helping them turn back from the brink of war. In 1992, South African President F. W. de Klerk met with Nelson Mandela and Chief Mangosuthu Buthelezi at the annual meeting, their first joint appearance outside South Africa. At the 1994 annual meeting, Israeli Foreign Minister Shimon Peres and PLO chairman Yasser Arafat reached a draft agreement on Gaza and Jericho.

In October 2004, the World Economic Forum gained attention through the resignation of its CEO and executive director José María Figueres over the undeclared receipt of more than US$900,000 in consultancy fees from the French telecommunications firm Alcatel. Transparency International highlighted this incident in their Global Corruption Report two years later in 2006.

In January 2006, the WEF published an article in its Global Agenda magazine titled "Boycott Israel", which was distributed to all 2,340 participants of the Annual Meeting. Following the publication, Klaus Schwab described the publication as "an unacceptable failure in the editorial process".

In late 2015, the invitation was extended to include a North Korean delegation for the 2016 WEF, "in view of positive signs coming out of the country", the WEF organizers noted. North Korea has not been attending the WEF since 1998. The invitation was accepted. However, WEF revoked the invitation on 13 January 2016, after the 6 January 2016 North Korean nuclear test, and the country's attendance was made subject to "existing and possible forthcoming sanctions". Despite protests by North Korea calling the decision by the WEF managing board a "sudden and irresponsible" move, the WEF committee maintained the exclusion because "under these circumstances there would be no opportunity for international dialogue".

In 2017, the WEF in Davos attracted considerable attention when, for the first time, a head of state from the People's Republic of China was present at the alpine resort. With the backdrop of Brexit, an incoming protectionist US administration and significant pressures on free trade zones and trade agreements, Paramount leader Xi Jinping defended the global economic scheme, and portrayed China as a responsible nation and a leader for environmental causes. He sharply rebuked the current populist movements that would introduce tariffs and hinder global commerce, warning that such protectionism could foster isolation and reduced economic opportunity.

In 2018, Indian Prime Minister Narendra Modi gave the plenary speech, becoming the first head of government from India to deliver the inaugural keynote for the annual meet at Davos. Modi highlighted global warming (climate change), terrorism and protectionism as the three major global challenges, and expressed confidence that they can be tackled with collective effort.

In 2019, Brazilian President Jair Bolsonaro gave the keynote address at the plenary session of the conference. On his first international trip to Davos, he emphasized liberal economic policies despite his populist agenda, and attempted to reassure the world that Brazil is a protector of the rain forest while utilizing its resources for food production and export. He stated that "his government will seek to better integrate Brazil into the world by mainstreaming international best practices, such as those adopted and promoted by the OECD". Environmental concerns like extreme weather events, and the failure of climate change mitigation and adaptation were among the top-ranking global risks expressed by WEF attendees.

The 2021 World Economic Forum was due to be held from 17 to 20 August in Singapore. However, on 17 May the Forum was cancelled; with a new meeting to take place in the first half of 2022 instead with a final location and date to be determined later in 2021.

In late December 2021, the World Economic Forum said in a release that pandemic conditions had made it extremely difficult to stage a global in-person meeting the following month; transmissibility of the SARS-CoV-2 Omicron variant and its impact on travel and mobility had made deferral necessary. In early 2022, the annual meeting in Davos was rescheduled for 22 to 26 May 2022. Its themes include the Russo-Ukrainian War, climate change, energy insecurity and inflation. Ukraine's president Volodymyr Zelenskyy gave a special address at the meeting, thanking the global community for its efforts but also calling for more support. The 2022 Forum was marked by the absence of a Russian delegation for the first time since 1991, which The Wall Street Journal described as signalling the "unraveling of globalization." The former Russia House was used to present Russia's war crimes.

The 2023 annual meeting of the World Economic Forum took place in Davos, Switzerland from 16-20 January under the motto "Cooperation in a fragmented world".

Organization
Headquartered in Cologny, the WEF also has offices in New York, Beijing and Tokyo. In January 2015, it was designated an NGO with "other international body" status by the Swiss Federal Government under the Swiss Host-State Act.

On 10 October 2016, the WEF announced the opening of its new Center for the Fourth Industrial Revolution in San Francisco. According to the WEF, the center will "serve as a platform for interaction, insight and impact on the scientific and technological changes that are changing the way we live, work and relate to one another".

The World Economic Forum claims to be impartial and that it is not tied to any political, partisan, or national interests. Until 2012, it had observer status with the United Nations Economic and Social Council, when it was revoked; it is under the supervision of the Swiss Federal Council. The foundation's highest governance body is the foundation board.

The managing board is chaired by the WEF's president, Børge Brende, and acts as the executive body of the World Economic Forum. Managing board members are Børge Brende, Julien Gattoni, Jeremy Jurgens, Adrian Monck, Sarita Nayyar, Olivier M. Schwab, Saadia Zahidi, and Alois Zwinggi.

Board of trustees
The WEF is chaired by founder and executive chairman Professor Klaus Schwab and is guided by a board of trustees that is made up of leaders from business, politics, academia and civil society. In 2010 the board was composed of: Josef Ackermann, Peter Brabeck-Letmathe, Kofi Annan, Victor L. L. Chu, Tony Blair, Michael S. Dell, Niall FitzGerald, Susan Hockfield, Orit Gadiesh, Christine Lagarde, Carlos Ghosn, Maurice Lévy, Rajat Gupta, Indra Nooyi, Peter D. Sutherland, Ivan Pictet, Heizo Takenaka, Ernesto Zedillo Ponce de Leon, 
Joseph P. Schoendorf, H.M. Queen Rania Al Abdullah. Members of the board of trustees (past or present) include: Mukesh Ambani, Marc Benioff, Peter Brabeck-Letmathe, Mark Carney, Laurence D. Fink, Chrystia Freeland, Orit Gadiesh, Fabiola Gianotti, Al Gore, Herman Gref, José Ángel Gurría, André Hoffmann, Christine Lagarde, Ursula von der Leyen, Jack Ma, Yo-Yo Ma, Peter Maurer, Luis Alberto Moreno, Muriel Pénicaud, H.M. Queen Rania Al Abdullah of the Hashemite Kingdom of Jordan, L. Rafael Reif, David M. Rubenstein, Mark Schneider, Klaus Schwab, Tharman Shanmugaratnam, Jim Hagemann Snabe, Feike Sijbesma, Heizo Takenaka, Zhu Min.

Membership
The foundation is funded by its 1,000 member companies, typically global enterprises with more than five billion dollars in turnover (varying by industry and region). These enterprises rank among the top companies within their industry and/or country and play a leading role in shaping the future of their industry and/or region. Membership is stratified by the level of engagement with forum activities, with the level of membership fees increasing as participation in meetings, projects, and initiatives rises. In 2011, an annual membership cost $52,000 for an individual member, $263,000 for "Industry Partner" and $527,000 for "Strategic Partner". An admission fee costs $19,000 per person. In 2014, WEF raised annual fees by 20 percent, bringing the cost for "Strategic Partner" from CHF 500,000 ($523,000) to CHF 600,000 ($628,000).

Activities

Annual meeting in Davos

The flagship event of the World Economic Forum is the invitation-only annual meeting held at the end of January in Davos, Switzerland, bringing together chief executive officers from its 1,000 member companies, as well as selected politicians, representatives from academia, NGOs, religious leaders, and the media in an alpine environment. The winter discussions ostensibly focus around key issues of global concern (such as the globalization, capital markets, wealth management, international conflicts, environmental problems and their possible solutions). The participants also take part in role playing events, such as the Investment Heat Map. Informal winter meetings may have led to as many ideas and solutions as the official sessions.

At the 2018 annual meeting, more than 3,000 participants from nearly 110 countries participated in over 400 sessions. Participation included more than 340 public figures, including more than 70 heads of state and government and 45 heads of international organizations; 230 media representatives and almost 40 cultural leaders were represented.

As many as 500 journalists from online, print, radio, and television take part, with access to all sessions in the official program, some of which are also webcast. Not all the journalists are given access to all areas, however. This is reserved for white badge holders. "Davos runs an almost caste-like system of badges", according to BBC journalist Anthony Reuben. "A white badge means you're one of the delegates – you might be the chief executive of a company or the leader of a country (although that would also get you a little holographic sticker to add to your badge), or a senior journalist. An orange badge means you're just a run-of-the-mill working journalist." All plenary debates from the annual meeting also are available on YouTube while photographs are available on Flickr.

Individual participants

Some 3,000 individual participants joined the 2020 annual meeting in Davos. Countries with the most attendees include the United States (674 participants), the United Kingdom (270), Switzerland (159), Germany (137) and India (133). Among the attendees were heads of state or government, cabinet ministers, ambassadors, heads or senior officials of international organizations) attended the annual meeting, including: Sanna Marin (prime minister of Finland), Ursula von der Leyen (president of the European Commission), Christine Lagarde (ECB president), Greta Thunberg (climate activist), Ren Zhengfei (Huawei Technologies founder), Kristalina Georgieva (managing director of the IMF), Deepika Padukone (Bollywood actress), George Soros (investor) and Donald Trump (president of the United States).

An analysis by The Economist from 2014 found that the vast majority of participants are male and more than 50 years old. Careers in business account for most of the participants' backgrounds (1,595 conference attendees), with the remaining seats shared between government (364), NGOs (246) and press (234). Academia, which had been the basis of the first annual conference in 1971, had been marginalised to the smallest participant group (183 attendees).

Corporate participants
Next to individual participants, the World Economic Forum maintains a dense network of corporate partners that can apply for different partnership ranks within the forum. For 2019, Bloomberg has identified a total of 436 listed corporates that participated in the Annual Meeting while measuring a stock underperformance by the Davos participants of around -10% versus the S&P 500 during the same year. Drivers are among others an overrepresentation of financial companies and an underrepresentation of fast-growing health care and information technology businesses at the conference. The Economist had found similar results in an earlier study, showing an underperformance of Davos participants against both the MSCI World Index and the S&P 500 between 2009 and 2014.

Summer annual meeting
In 2007, the foundation established the Annual Meeting of the New Champions (also called Summer Davos), held annually in China, alternating between Dalian and Tianjin, bringing together 1,500 participants from what the foundation calls Global Growth Companies, primarily from rapidly growing emerging countries such as China, India, Russia, Mexico, and Brazil, but also including quickly growing companies from developed countries. The meeting also engages with the next generation of global leaders from fast-growing regions and competitive cities, as well as technology pioneers from around the globe. The Premier of China has delivered a plenary address at each annual meeting.

Regional meetings

Every year regional meetings take place, enabling close contact among corporate business leaders, local government leaders, and NGOs. Meetings are held in Africa, East Asia, Latin America, and the Middle East. The mix of hosting countries varies from year to year, but consistently China and India have hosted throughout the decade since 2000.

Young Global Leaders
The group of Young Global Leaders consists of 800 people chosen by the WEF organizers as being representative of contemporary leadership. After five years of participation they are considered alumni. The program has received controversy when Schwab, the founder, admitted to "penetrat[ing]" governments with Young Global Leaders. He added that as of 2017 “more than half” of Justin Trudeau’s Cabinet had been members of the program.

Social entrepreneurs
Since 2000, the WEF has been promoting models developed by those in close collaboration with the Schwab Foundation for Social Entrepreneurship, highlighting social entrepreneurship as a key element to advance societies and address social problems. Selected social entrepreneurs are invited to participate in the foundation's regional meetings and the annual meetings where they may meet chief executives and senior government officials. At the Annual Meeting 2003, for example, Jeroo Billimoria met with Roberto Blois, deputy secretary-general of the International Telecommunication Union, an encounter that produced a key partnership for her organization Child helpline international.

Research reports

The foundation also acts as a think tank, publishing a wide range of reports. In particular, "Strategic Insight Teams" focus on producing reports of relevance in the fields of competitiveness, global risks, and scenario thinking.

The "Competitiveness Team" produces a range of annual economic reports (first published in brackets): the Global Competitiveness Report (1979) measured competitiveness of countries and economies; The Global Information Technology Report (2001) assessed their competitiveness based on their IT readiness; the Global Gender Gap Report examined critical areas of inequality between men and women; the Global Risks Report (2006) assessed key global risks; the Global Travel and Tourism Report (2007) measured travel and tourism competitiveness; the Financial Development Report (2008) aimed to provide a comprehensive means for countries to establish benchmarks for various aspects of their financial systems and establish priorities for improvement; and the Global Enabling Trade Report (2008) presented a cross-country analysis of the large number of measures facilitating trade among nations.

The "Risk Response Network" produces a yearly report assessing risks which are deemed to be within the scope of these teams, have cross-industry relevance, are uncertain, have the potential to cause upwards of US$10 billion in economic damage, have the potential to cause major human suffering, and which require a multi-stakeholder approach for mitigation.

In 2020, the forum published a report named: "Nature Risk Rising". In this report the forum estimated that approximately half of the global GDP is dependent highly or moderately on nature and 1 dollar spent on nature restoration yields 9 dollars in profit.

Initiatives

Health 
The Global Health Initiative was launched by Kofi Annan at the annual meeting in 2002. The GHI's mission was to engage businesses in public-private partnerships to tackle HIV/AIDS, tuberculosis, malaria, and health systems.

The Global Education Initiative (GEI), launched during the annual meeting in 2003, brought together international IT companies and governments in Jordan, Egypt, and India that has resulted in new personal computer hardware being available in their classrooms and more local teachers trained in e-learning. The GEI model, which is scalable and sustainable, now is being used as an educational blueprint in other countries including Rwanda.

On 19 January 2017 the Coalition for Epidemic Preparedness Innovations (CEPI), a global initiative to fight epidemics, was launched at WEF in Davos. The internationally funded initiative aims at securing vaccine supplies for global emergencies and pandemics, and to research new vaccines for tropical diseases, that are now more menacing. The project is funded by private and governmental donors, with an initial investment of US$460m from the governments of Germany, Japan and Norway, plus the Bill & Melinda Gates Foundation and the Wellcome Trust.

2020 meeting
Between 21 and 24 January 2020, at the early stages of the COVID-19 outbreak, CEPI met with leaders from Moderna to establish plans for a COVID-19 vaccine at the Davos gathering, with a total global case number of 274 and total loss of life the virus at 16.

The WHO declared a global health emergency 6 days later.

Society 
The Water Initiative brings together diverse stakeholders such as Alcan Inc., the Swiss Agency for Development and Cooperation, USAID India, UNDP India, Confederation of Indian Industry (CII), Government of Rajasthan, and the NEPAD Business Foundation to develop public-private partnerships on water management in South Africa and India.

In an effort to combat corruption, the Partnering Against Corruption Initiative (PACI) was launched by CEOs from the engineering and construction, energy and metals, and mining industries at the annual meeting in Davos during January 2004. PACI is a platform for peer exchange on practical experience and dilemma situations. Approximately 140 companies have joined the initiative.

Environment 

In the beginning of the 21st century, the forum began to increasingly deal with environmental issues. In the Davos Manifesto 2020 it is said that a company among other:
 "acts as a steward of the environmental and material universe for future generations. It consciously protects our biosphere and champions a circular, shared and regenerative economy."
 "responsibly manages near-term, medium-term and long-term value creation in pursuit of sustainable shareholder returns that do not sacrifice the future for the present."
 "is more than an economic unit generating wealth. It fulfils human and societal aspirations as part of the broader social system. Performance must be measured not only on the return to shareholders, but also on how it achieves its environmental, social and good governance objectives."

The Environmental Initiative covers climate change and water issues. Under the Gleneagles Dialogue on Climate Change, the U.K. government asked the World Economic Forum at the G8 Summit in Gleneagles in 2005 to facilitate a dialogue with the business community to develop recommendations for reducing greenhouse gas emissions. This set of recommendations, endorsed by a global group of CEOs, was presented to leaders ahead of the G8 Summit in Toyako, Hokkaido, Japan held in July 2008.

In 2016 WEF published an article in which it is said, that in some cases reducing consumption can increase well-being. In the article is mentioned that in Costa Rica the GDP is 4 times smaller than in many countries in Western Europe and North America, but people live longer and better. An American study shows that those whose income is higher than $75,000, do not necessarily have an increase in well-being. To better measure well-being, the New Economics Foundation's launched the Happy Planet Index.

In January 2017, WEF launched the Platform for Accelerating the Circular Economy (PACE), which is a global public private partnership seeking to scale circular economy innovations. PACE is co-chaired by Frans van Houten (CEO of Philips), Naoko Ishii (CEO of the Global Environment Facility, and the head of United Nations Environment Programme (UNEP). The Ellen MacArthur Foundation, the International Resource Panel, Circle Economy, Chatham House, the Dutch National Institute for Public Health and the Environment, the United Nations Environment Programme and Accenture serve as knowledge partners, and the program is supported by the UK Department for Environment, Food and Rural Affairs, DSM, FrieslandCampina, Global Affairs Canada, the Dutch Ministry of Infrastructure and Water Management, Rabobank, Shell, SITRA, and Unilever.

The Forum emphasized its 'Environment and Natural Resource Security Initiative' for the 2017 meeting to achieve inclusive economic growth and sustainable practices for global industries. With increasing limitations on world trade through national interests and trade barriers, the WEF has moved towards a more sensitive and socially-minded approach for global businesses with a focus on the reduction of carbon emissions in China and other large industrial nations.

Also in 2017, WEF launched the Fourth Industrial Revolution (4IR) for the Earth Initiative, a collaboration among WEF, Stanford University and PwC, and funded through the Mava Foundation. In 2018, WEF announced that one project within this initiative was to be the Earth BioGenome Project, the aim of which is to sequence the genomes of every organism on Earth.

The World Economic Forum is working to eliminate plastic pollution, stating that by 2050 it will consume 15% of the global carbon budget and will pass by its weight fishes in the world's oceans. One of the methods is to achieve circular economy.

The theme of the 2020 World Economic Forum annual meeting was 'Stakeholders for a Cohesive and Sustainable World'. Climate change and sustainability were central themes of discussion. Many argued that GDP is failed to represent correctly the wellbeing and that fossil fuel subsidies should be stopped. Many of the participants said that a better capitalism is needed. Al Gore summarized the ideas in the conference as: "The version of capitalism we have today in our world must be reformed".

In this meeting the World Economic Forum:

 Launched the Trillion Tree Campaign an initiative aiming to "grow, restore and conserve 1 trillion trees over the next 10 years around the world - in a bid to restore biodiversity and help fight climate change". Donald Trump joined the initiative. The forum stated that: "Nature-based solutions – locking-up carbon in the world’s forests, grasslands and wetlands – can provide up to one-third of the emissions reductions required by 2030 to meet the Paris Agreement targets," adding that the rest should come from the heavy industry, finance and transportation sectors. One of the targets is to unify existing reforestation projects
 Discussed the issue of climate change and called to expanding renewable energy, energy efficiency change the patterns of consumption and remove carbon from the atmosphere. The forum claimed that the climate crisis will become a climate apocalypse if the temperature will rise by 2 degrees. The forum called to fulfill the commitments in Paris Agreement. Jennifer Morgan, the executive director of Greenpeace, said that as to the beginning of the forum, fossil fuels still get three times more money than climate solutions.

At the 2021 annual meeting UNFCCC launched the 'UN Race-to-Zero Emissions Breakthroughs'. The aim of the campaign is to transform 20 sectors of the economy in order to achieve zero greenhouse gas emissions. At least 20% of each sector should take specific measures, and 10 sectors should be transformed before COP 26 in Glasgow. According to the organizers, 20% is a tipping point, after which the whole sector begins to irreversibly change.

Coronavirus and green recovery 
In April 2020, the forum published an article that postulates that the COVID-19 pandemic is linked to the destruction of nature. The number of emerging diseases is rising and this rise is linked to deforestation and species loss. In the article, there are multiple examples of the degradation of ecological systems caused by humans. It is also says that half of the global GDP is moderately or largely dependent on nature. The article concludes that the recovery from the pandemic should be linked to nature recovery.

The forum proposed a plan for a green recovery. The plan includes advancing circular economy. Among the mentioned methods, there is green building, sustainable transport, organic farming, urban open space, renewable energy and electric vehicles.

Global Future Councils 
The Network of Global Future Councils meets annually in the United Arab Emirates and virtually several times a year. The second WEF annual meeting was held in Dubai in November 2017, when there were 35 distinct councils focused on a specific issue, industry or technology. In 2017 members met with representatives and partners of WEF's new Center for the Fourth Industrial Revolution. Ideas and proposals are taken forward for further discussion at the World Economic Forum Annual Meeting in Davos-Klosters in January.

Global Shapers Community 
The Global Shapers Community (GSC), an initiative of World Economic Forum, selects young leaders below 30 years old based on their achievement and potential to be change agents in the world. Global Shapers develop and lead their city-based hubs to implement social justice projects that advance the mission of World Economic Forum. The GSC has over 10,000 members in 500+ hubs in 154 countries. Some critics see the WEF's increasing focus on activist areas such as environmental protection and social entrepreneurship as a strategy to disguise the true plutocratic goals of the organisation.

Project Divisions 
Projects are divided into 17 areas of impact: Arts and Culture, Cities & Urbanization, Civic Participation, Climate Change, Covid-19 Response, Education, Entrepreneurship, Fourth Industrial Revolution, Gender equality, Global Health, Migration, Shaping the Future, Sustainable Development, Values, Water, #WeSeeEqual, and Workforce and Employment.

In Sustainable Development, the community has launched the Shaping Fashion Initiative involving the hubs of Dusseldorf, Corrientes, Lahore, Davao, Milan, Lyon, Quito, Taipei, and others.

In Entrepreneurship, Bucharest has hosted the Social Impact Award since 2009. It runs education and incubation programs in more than 20 countries in Europe, Africa, and Asia and has impacted 1000+ young social entrepreneurs aged 14-30 years old. In North America, New York has hosted the OneRise startup accelerator since 2021.

Future of work 
In regards to the future of work, the 2020 WEF set the goal of providing better jobs, access to higher quality education and skills to 1 billion people by 2030.

The Great Reset 

In May 2020, the WEF and the Prince of Wales's Sustainable Markets Initiative launched "The Great Reset" project, a five-point plan to enhance sustainable economic growth following the global recession caused by the COVID-19 pandemic lockdowns. "The Great Reset" was to be the theme of WEF's Annual Meeting in August 2021.

According to forum founder Schwab, the intention of the project is to reconsider the meaning of capitalism and capital. While not abandoning capitalism, he proposes to change and possibly move on from some aspects of it, including neoliberalism and free-market fundamentalism. The role of corporations, taxation and more should be reconsidered. International cooperation and trade should be defended and the Fourth Industrial Revolution also.

The forum defines the system that it wants to create as "Stakeholder Capitalism". The forum support Trade unions.

Criticism

Physical protests

During the late 1990s, the WEF, as well as the G7, World Bank, World Trade Organization, and International Monetary Fund, came under heavy criticism by anti-globalization activists who claimed that capitalism and globalization were increasing poverty and destroying the environment. In 2000, about 10,000 demonstrators disrupted a regional WEF meeting in Melbourne, by obstructing the path of 200 delegates. Small demonstrations are held in Davos on most but not all years, organised by the local Green Party (see Anti-WEF protests in Switzerland, January 2003) to protest against what have been called the meetings of "fat cats in the snow", a tongue-in-cheek term used by rock singer Bono.

After 2014, the physical protest movement against the World Economic Forum largely died down, and Swiss police noted a significant decline in attending protesters, 20 at most during the meeting in 2016. While protesters are still more numerous in large Swiss cities, the protest movement itself has undergone significant change. Around 150 Tibetans and Uighurs protested in Geneva and 400 Tibetans in Bern against the visit of China's paramount leader Xi Jinping for the 2017 meeting, with subsequent confrontations and arrests.

Growing gaps in wealth
A number of NGOs have used the World Economic Forum to highlight growing inequalities and wealth gaps, which they consider not to be addressed extensively enough or even to be fortified through institutions like the WEF. Winnie Byanyima, the executive director of the anti-poverty confederation Oxfam International co-chaired the 2015 meeting, where she presented a critical report of global wealth distribution based on statistical research by the Credit Suisse Research Institute. In this study, the richest 1% of people in the world own 48% of the world's wealth. At the 2019 meeting, she presented another report claiming that the gap between rich and poor has only increased. The report "Public Good or Private Wealth" stated that 2,200 billionaires worldwide saw their wealth grow by 12% while the poorest half saw its wealth fall by 11%. Oxfam calls for a global tax overhaul to increase and harmonise global tax rates for corporations and wealthy individuals.

Formation of a detached elite

The formation of a detached elite, which is often co-labelled through the neologism "Davos Man", refers to a global group whose members view themselves as completely "international". The term refers to people who "have little need for national loyalty, view national boundaries as obstacles, and see national governments as residues from the past whose only useful function is to facilitate the elite's global operations" according to political scientist Samuel P. Huntington, who is credited with inventing the neologism. In his 2004 article "Dead Souls: The Denationalization of the American Elite", Huntington argues that this international perspective is a minority elitist position not shared by the nationalist majority of the people.

The Transnational Institute describes the World Economic Forum's main purpose as being "to function as a socializing institution for the emerging global elite, globalization's "Mafiocracy" of bankers, industrialists, oligarchs, technocrats and politicians. They promote common ideas, and serve common interests: their own."

In 2019, the Manager Magazin journalist Henrik Müller argued that the "Davos Man" had already decayed into different groups and camps. He sees three central drivers for this development:
 Ideologically: the liberal western model is no longer considered a universal role model that other countries strive for (with China's digital totalitarianism or the traditional absolutism in the Persian Gulf as counter-proposals, all of which are represented by government members in Davos).
 Socially: societies increasingly disintegrate into different groups, each of which evokes its own identity (e.g. embodied through the Brexit vote or congressional blockades in the USA).
 Economically: the measured economic reality largely contradicts the established ideas of how the economy should actually work (despite economic upswings, wages and prices e.g. barely rise).

Public cost of security

Critics argue that the WEF, despite having reserves of several hundred million Swiss francs and paying its executives salaries of around 1 million Swiss francs per year, would not pay any federal tax and moreover allocate a part of its costs to the public. Following massive criticism from politicians and the Swiss civil society, the Swiss federal government decided in February 2021 to reduce its annual contributions to the WEF.

As of 2018, the police and military expenditures carried by the Federal Government stood at 39 million Swiss francs. The Aargauer Zeitung argued in January 2020 that the additional cost borne by the Kanton Graubünden stand at CHF 9 million per year.

The Swiss Green Party summarised their criticism within the Swiss National Council that the holding of the World Economic Forum has cost Swiss taxpayers hundreds of millions of Swiss francs over the past decades. In their view, it was however questionable to what extent the Swiss population or global community benefit from these expenditures.

Gender debate

Women have been broadly underrepresented at the WEF, according to some critics. The female participation rate at the WEF increased from 9% to 15% between 2001 and 2005. In 2016, 18% of the WEF attendees were female; this number increased to 21% in 2017, and 24% in 2020.

Several women have since shared their personal impressions of the Davos meetings in media articles, highlighting that issues were more profound than "a quota at Davos for female leaders or a session on diversity and inclusion". The World Economic Forum has in this context filed legal complaints against at least three investigative articles by reporters Katie Gibbons and Billy Kenber that were published by the British newspaper The Times in March 2020.

Undemocratic decision making
According to the European Parliament's think tank, critics see the WEF as an instrument for political and business leaders to "take decisions without having to account to their electorate or shareholders".

Since 2009, the WEF has been working on a project called the Global Redesign Initiative (GRI), which proposes a transition away from intergovernmental decision-making towards a system of multi-stakeholder governance. According to the Transnational Institute (TNI), the Forum is hence planning to replace a recognised democratic model with a model where a self-selected group of "stakeholders" make decisions on behalf of the people.

Some critics have seen the WEFs attention to goals like environmental protection and social entrepreneurship as mere window dressing to disguise its true plutocratic nature and goals. In a Guardian opinion piece, Cas Mudde said that such plutocrats should not be the group to have control over the political agendas and decide which issues to focus on and how to support them. A writer in the German magazine Cicero saw the situation as academic, cultural, media and economic elites grasping for social power while disregarding political decision processes. A materially well-endowed milieu would in this context try to "cement its dominance of opinion and sedate ordinary people with maternalistic-paternalistic social benefits, so that they are not disturbed by the common people when they steer". The French Les Echos furthermore concludes that Davos "represents the exact values people rejected at the ballot box".

Lack of financial transparency 

In 2017, the former Frankfurter Allgemeine Zeitung journalist Jürgen Dunsch criticized that financial reports of the WEF were not very transparent since neither income nor expenditures were broken down. In addition, he outlined that the foundation capital was not quantified while the apparently not insignificant profits would be reinvested.

Recent annual reports published by the WEF include a more detailed breakdown of its financials and indicate revenues of CHF 349 million for the year 2019 with reserves of CHF 310 million and a foundation capital of CHF 34 million. There are no further details provided to what asset classes or individual names the WEF allocates its financial assets of CHF 261 million.

The German newspaper Süddeutsche Zeitung criticised in this context that the WEF had turned into a "money printing machine", which is run like a family business and forms a comfortable way to make a living for its key personnel. The foundation's founder Klaus Schwab draws a salary of around one million Swiss francs per year.

Unclear selection criteria 

In a request to the Swiss National Council, the Swiss Green Party criticised that invitations to the annual meeting and programmes of the World Economic Forum are issued according to unclear criteria. They highlight that "despots" such as the son of the former Libyan dictator Saif al-Islam al-Gaddafi had been invited to the WEF and even awarded membership in the club of "Young Global Leaders". Even after the beginning of the Arab spring in December 2010 and related violent uprisings against despot regimes, the WEF continued to invite Gaddafi to its annual meeting.

Environmental footprint of annual meetings 
Critics emphasise that the annual meeting of the World Economic Forum is counterproductive when combating pressing problems of humanity such as the climate crisis. Even in 2020, participants travelled to the WEF annual meeting in Davos on around 1,300 private jets while the total emissions burden from transport and accommodation were enormous in their view.

Corporate capture of global and democratic institutions 
The World Economic Forum's "Global Redesign" report suggests to create "public-private" United Nations (UN) in which selected agencies operate and steer global agendas under shared governance systems. It says that a globalised world is probably best managed by a coalition of multinational corporations, governments and civil society organizations (CSOs), which it expresses through initiatives like the "Great Reset" and the "Global Redesign".

In a 2017 interview, Schwab said that Russian President Vladimir Putin had been recognized as a Young Global Leader, and also mentioned Canadian Prime Minister Justin Trudeau: "I have to say, when I mention now names, like Mrs. (Angela) Merkel and even Vladimir Putin, and so on, they all have been Young Global Leaders of the World Economic Forum. But what we are very proud of now is the young generation like Prime Minister (Justin) Trudeau ... We penetrate the cabinet. So yesterday I was at a reception for Prime Minister Trudeau and I know that half of his cabinet, or even more than half of his cabinet, are actually Young Global Leaders."

In September 2019, more than 400 civil society organizations and 40 international networks heavily criticised a partnership agreement between WEF and the United Nations and called on the UN Secretary-General to end it. They see such an agreement as a "disturbing corporate capture of the UN, which moved the world dangerously towards a privatised global governance". The Dutch Transnational Institute think tank summarises that we are increasingly entering a world where gatherings such as Davos are "a silent global coup d'état" to capture governance.

In December 2021, the Dutch government published its past correspondence with representatives of the World Economic Forum, showing extensive interaction between the WEF and the Dutch government. The documents were officially made available by the Dutch government.

Non-accreditation of critical media outlets 
In 2019, the Swiss newspaper WOZ received a refusal of its accreditation request for the Annual Meeting with the editors and subsequently accused the World Economic Forum of favoring specific media outlets. The newspaper highlighted that the WEF stated in its refusal message that it [the Forum] prefers media outlets it works with throughout the year. WOZ deputy head Yves Wegelin called this a strange idea of journalism because in "journalism you don't necessarily have to work with large corporations, but rather critique them".

Institutional initiatives 
In addition to economic policy, the WEF's agenda is in recent years increasingly focusing on positively connotated activist topics such as environmental protection and social entrepreneurship, which critics see as a strategy to disguise the organisation's true plutocratic goals.

In a December 2020 article by The Intercept, author Naomi Klein described that the WEF's initiatives like the "Great Reset" were simply a "coronavirus-themed rebranding" of things that the WEF was already doing and that it was an attempt by the rich to make themselves look good. In her opinion, "the Great Reset is merely the latest edition of this gilded tradition, barely distinguishable from earlier Davos Big Ideas.

Similarly, in his review of COVID-19: The Great Reset, ethicist Steven Umbrello makes parallel critiques of the agenda. He says that the WEF "whitewash[es] a seemingly optimistic future post-Great Reset with buzz words like equity and sustainability" while it functionally jeopardizes those goals.

A study published in the Journal of Consumer Research investigated the sociological impact of the WEF. It concluded that the WEF do not solve issues such as poverty, global warming, chronic illness, or debt. The Forum has, according to the study, simply shifted the burden for the solution of these problems from governments and business to "responsible consumers subjects: the green consumer, the health-conscious consumer, and the financially literate consumer."

Appropriation of global crises 
In December 2021, the Catholic Cardinal and former Prefect of the Congregation for the Doctrine of the Faith (CDF) Gerhard Ludwig Müller criticised in a controversial interview that people like WEF founder Schwab were sitting "on the throne of their wealth" and were not touched by the everyday difficulties and sufferings people face e.g. due to the COVID-19 pandemic. On the contrary, such elites would see crises as an opportunity to push through their agendas. He particularly criticised the control such people would exercise on people and their embracement of areas such as transhumanism. The German Central Council of Jews condemned this criticism, which is also linked to Jewish financial investors, as anti-Semitic.

Controversies

Controversy with Davos municipality 
In June 2021, WEF founder Klaus Schwab sharply criticised what he characterized as the "profiteering", "complacency" and "lack of commitment" by the municipality of Davos in relation to the annual meeting. He mentioned that the preparation of the COVID-related meeting in Singapore in 2021/2022 had created an alternative to its Swiss host and sees the chance that the annual meeting will stay in Davos between 40 and 70 per cent.

Controversy on usage of Davos name 
As there are many other international conferences nicknamed with "Davos" such as the "Davos of the Desert" event organised by Saudi Arabia's Future Investment Initiative Institute, the World Economic Forum objected to the use of "Davos" in such contexts for any event not organised by them. This particular statement was issued on 22 October 2018, a day before the opening of 2018 Future Investment Initiative (nicknamed "Davos in the desert") organised by the Public Investment Fund of Saudi Arabia.

Alternatives

Open Forum Davos 
Since the annual meeting in January 2003 in Davos, an Open Forum Davos, which was co-organized by the Federation of Swiss Protestant Churches, is held concurrently with the Davos forum, opening up the debate about globalization to the general public. The Open Forum has been held in the local high school every year, featuring top politicians and business leaders. It is open to all members of the public free of charge.

Public Eye Awards 
The Public Eye Awards have been held every year since 2000. It is a counter-event to the annual meeting of the World Economic Forum (WEF) in Davos. Public Eye Awards is a "public competition of the worst corporations in the world." In 2011, more than 50,000 people voted for companies that acted irresponsibly. At a ceremony at a Davos hotel, the "winners" in 2011 were named as Indonesian palm oil diesel maker, Neste Oil in Finland, and mining company AngloGold Ashanti in South Africa. According to Schweiz aktuell broadcast on 16 January 2015, a public presence during the WEF 2015, may not be guaranteed because the massively increased security in Davos. The Public Eye Award will be awarded for the last time in Davos: Public Eyes says Goodbye to Davos, confirmed by Rolf Marugg (now Landrats politician), by not directly engaged politicians, and by the police responsible.

See also

 Bilderberg meeting
 Event 201
 World Youth Forum
 2009 Davos incident
 Asian Leadership Conference
 Boao Forum for Asia
 Davos process
 Antalya Diplomacy Forum
 Eurofi
 European Business Summit
 Horasis
 International Transport Forum
 St. Petersburg International Economic Forum
 World Knowledge Forum
 World Social Forum

References

Sources
 Bornstein, David (2007). How to Change the World – Social Entrepreneurs and the Power of New Ideas. Oxford University Press (New York City). . 358 pages.
 Kellerman, Barbara (1999). Reinventing Leadership – Making the Connection Between Politics and Business. State University of New York Press (Albany, New York). . 268 pages.
 Moore, Mike (2003). A World Without Walls – Freedom, Development, Free Trade and Global Governance. Cambridge University Press (Cambridge, England; New York City). . 292 pages.
 Pigman, Geoffrey Allen (2007). The World Economic Forum – A Multi-Stakeholder Approach to Global Governance. Routledge (London, England; New York City). . 175 pages.
 Rothkopf, David J. (2008). Superclass – The Global Power Elite and the World They Are Making. Farrar, Straus and Giroux (New York City). . 376 pages.
 Schwab, Klaus M.; Kroos, Hein (1971). Moderne Unternehmensführung im Maschinenbau. Verein Dt. Maschinenbau-Anst. e.V. Maschinenbau-Verl (Frankfurt om Main, Germany). .
 Wolf, Michael (1999). The Entertainment Economy – How Mega-Media Forces Are Transforming Our Lives. Random House (New York City). . 336 pages.
 "Behind the Scenes at Davos" broadcast 14 February 2010 on 60 Minutes
 ´How to Open the World Economic Forum´ – Matthias Lüfkens in Interview with 99FACES.tv
 "Everybody’s Business: Strengthening International Cooperation in a More Interdependent World" launched May 2010, Doha, Qatar

External links

WEF Board of Trustees
 
 
"Klaus Schwab and Prince Charles on why we need a Great Reset" at World Economic Forum
 Klaus Schwab in "A Conversation with Henry Kissinger on the World in 2017" at World Economic Forum

World Economic Forum
1971 in economics
1971 establishments in Switzerland
Advocacy groups
Davos
Foundations based in Switzerland
Organisations based in Geneva
Organizations established in 1971
Global economic conferences
Lobbying organizations